Jorge Vago (25 August 1927 – 2 March 2013) was an Argentine sailor. He competed in the Star event at the 1968 Summer Olympics.

References

External links
 

1927 births
2013 deaths
Argentine male sailors (sport)
Olympic sailors of Argentina
Sailors at the 1968 Summer Olympics – Star
Sportspeople from Buenos Aires